Tacoma is a Census-designated place and coal town located in Wise County, Virginia, United States with a population of 204 at the 2020 census. It is located within the Big Stone Gap, Virginia micropolitan area.

References

Unincorporated communities in Wise County, Virginia
Unincorporated communities in Virginia
Census-designated places in Wise County, Virginia
Census-designated places in Virginia
Coal towns in Virginia